Oryx may refer to:

Biology and medicine
 Oryx, an antelope genus
 ORYX, The Joint Commission performance measurement initiative (healthcare)

Fiction, myths and media
 Oryx, one of the title characters of the 2003 Margaret Atwood novel Oryx and Crake
 Oryx (journal), a scientific journal of conservation biology
 Oryx, name of the antagonist in the Destiny: The Taken King expansion of the video game Destiny
 Oryx, the antagonist in the MMORPG Realm of the Mad God
 Oryx (website), an investigative research website known for tracking equipment losses during the 2022 Russian invasion of Ukraine
 Oryx, an Elder god in the Cthulhu Mythos

Geography
 Oryx (ancient city), an ancient city in Arcadia
 Oryx, a name of the 16th nome of ancient Upper Egypt, centered on what is now Minya, Egypt

Sports
 Oryx Douala, a football club from Douala, Cameroon

Technology
 Atlas Oryx, a helicopter
 Oryx, the in-flight entertainment system on Qatar Airways
 Sea Oryx, a Taiwanese missile
 ORYX, an encryption algorithm
 ORYX GTL, a synthetic fuel plant in Qatar
 Oryx Sport Yachts & Cruisers, a brand of sports yachts created by Gulf Craft

See also
 Orix, a Japanese financial company